The 2005–06 Jordan FA Cup is the 26th edition of the Jordan FA Cup since its establishment in 1980. It started on 9 August 2005 and ended on 27 May 2006. The winner of the competition will earn a spot in the 2007 AFC Cup.

Shabab Al-Ordon won their first title after a 2–1 win over Al-Faisaly in the final on 27 May 2006.

Participating teams 
A total of 22 teams participated in this season. 10 teams from the 2005–06 Jordan League, 12 teams from the First Division.

First round 
In this round, each tie was played as a single match. Extra time and penalty shoot-out were used to decide the winner if necessary . The six winners of this round advanced to the round of 16 to join the 10 direct entrants.

Bracket 

Note:     H: Home team,   A: Away team

Round of 16 
The Round of 16 matches were played between 28 August and 1 September 2005.

Quarter-finals 
The Quarter-finals matches were played between 1 October and 29 December 2005.

Semi-finals 
The four winners of the quarter-finals progressed to the semi-finals. The semi-finals were played on 11 and 12 May 2006.

Final 
The final was played on 27 May 2006.

References

External links

Jordan FA Cup seasons
Jordan
2005–06 in Jordanian football